André Bourgeois (4 March 1928 – 18 October 2015) was a Belgian politician who was the Minister of Agriculture between 1992 and 1995. He had previously served as the Mayor of Izegem from 1965 to 1970.

Honours 
 12 February 1996: Grand officer of the Order of Orange-Nassau.
 14 November 1991: Commander of the Order of Leopold.
 8 July 1969: Knight of the Order of the Crown.
 9 June 1999 : Knight Grand Cross of the Order of Leopold II.

References

External links 
 André Bourgeois in ODIS - Online Database for Intermediary Structures 

1928 births
2015 deaths
Ministers of Agriculture of Belgium
Members of the Senate (Belgium)
Mayors of places in Belgium
Recipients of the Grand Cross of the Order of Leopold II